Danon Platina (Japanese: ダノンプラチナ, foaled 23 March 2012) is a Japanese Thoroughbred racehorse and sire. He was the best two-year-old colt in Japan in 2014 when he won his last three races including the Asahi Hai Futurity Stakes and was the unanimous choice for the JRA Award for Best Two-Year-Old Colt. In the following year he finished third in a strong edition of the Spring Stakes and defeated older opponent in the Fuji Stakes. He remained in training for another three years but made only seven appearances and won only one more race, the Listed New Year Stakes in 2018. He was retired from racing to become a breeding stallion in South Africa.

Background
Danon Platina is a grey stallion bred in Japan by Chiyoda Farm Shizunai. During his track career he carried the colours of Danox Co Ltd the business software enterprise of his owner Masahiro Noda, and was trained by Mitsumasa Nakauchida. He was ridden in most of his races by Masayoshi Ebina.

He was from the fifth crop of foals sired by Deep Impact, who was the Japanese Horse of the Year in 2005 and 2006, winning races including the Tokyo Yushun, Tenno Sho, Arima Kinen and Japan Cup. Deep Impact's other progeny include Gentildonna, Harp Star, Kizuna, A Shin Hikari, Marialite and Saxon Warrior. Danon Platina's dam Badeelah, from whom he inherited his grey colour, was an unraced, Kentucky-bred mare who was deported to Japan after being sold as a two-year-old for $32,000. Badeelah's dam Magical Allure won the La Brea Stakes and was closely related to the Kikuka Sho winner Narita Top Road.

Racing career

2014: two-year-old season

Danon Platina began his racing career at Sapporo Racecourse on 6 September 2014 when he finished second to Daitokyo in a contest for previously unraced juveniles over 1500 metres. In October he recorded his first success as he was a clear winner of a maiden race over 1600 metres at Tokyo Racecourse. In the Begonia Sho, over the same course and distance in November he won again, beating Mikki Universe by three lengths.

For his final race of the year Danon Platina was stepped up to Grade 1 Asahi Hai Futurity Stakes over 1600 metres at Hanshin Racecourse on 21 December and was made the 3.6/1 favourite. The best fancied of his seventeen opponents included Bright Emblem (Sapporo Nisai Stakes), Tagano Epresso (Daily Hai Nisai Stakes), Clarity Sky (Icho Stakes), Tagagno Azaghal (Manryo Sho) and Navion (Kikyo Stakes). After being restrained by Ebina towards the rear of the field the favourite made a forward move on the wide outside entering the straight. He accelerated past his rivals, overtook the front-running outsider Active Minoru 200 metres from the finish and held off the late challenge of Arma Waioli to win by three quarters of a length. Ebina commented "He was relaxed and had enough left in him by the last corner for a strong final run. He definitely takes after his sire Deep Impact, his finishing speed speaks for itself".

In January 2015 Danon Platina was named Best Two-Year-Old Colt at the JRA Awards for 2014, being the unanimous choice of the 285 voters.

2015: three-year-old season
On 22 March Danon Platina began his second campaign at Nakayama Racecourse in the Spring Stakes (a major trial for the Satsuki Sho) over 1800 metres and finished third, beaten a neck and half a length by Kitasan Black and Real Steel. In the Satsuki Sho over 2000 metres at the same track on 19 April he never looked likely to win and came home eleventh of the fifteen runners behind Duramente.

After a six month break Danon Platina returned in the Fuji Stakes over 1600 metres at Tokyo on 24 October, a race which saw him matched against older horses for the first time. Starting the 8.9/1 fourth choice in a sixteen-runner field he won by a neck and one and quarter lengths from the four-year-old Satono Aladdin and the five-year-old Logotype. For his final start of the year the colt was set to Sha Tin Racecourse for the Hong Kong Mile on 13 December and came home seventh, three lengths behind the winner Maurice.

2016, 2017 & 2018: later career
In 2016, Danon Platina began his season by finishing fourth behind the mare Smart Layer in the Tokyo Shimbun Hai on 7 February. After an absence of seven months he returned for the Keisei Hai Autumn Handicap at Nakayama in which he carried top weight and ran third to Lord Quest and Cafe Brilliant. At Tokyo in October he attempted to repeat his 2015 success in the Fuji Stakes but was beaten into third behind Young Man Power at Isla Bonita.

Danon Platina made only two appearances as a five-year-old in 2017 running fifth in the Sekiya Stakes at Niigata Racecourse in August and eighth in the Listed Capitak Stakes at Tokyo in November.

On 28 January 2018 the six-year-old horse contested the Listed New Year Stakes over 1600 metres and recorded his first win for well over two years as he came home ahead of the Hanshin Cup winner Shuji and eight others. On his final racecourse appearance he came home eleventh of the sixteen runners behind the filly Lys Gracieux in the Tokyo Shimbun Hai on 4 February.

Stud record
After the end of his racing career, Danon Platina was retired to become a breeding stallion at the Mauritzfontein Stud, Northern Cape, South Africa.

Pedigree

References

2012 racehorse births
Racehorses bred in Japan
Racehorses trained in Japan
Thoroughbred family 18